Ras-interacting protein 1 (RASIP1), also known as RAIN, is a protein that in humans is encoded by the RASIP1 gene.

Function 
 It is required for the proper formation of vascular structures that develop via both vasculogenesis and angiogenesis.
 Acts as a critical and vascular-specific regulator of GTPase signaling, cell architecture, and adhesion, which is essential for endothelial cell morphogenesis and blood vessel tubulogenesis.
 Regulates the activity of Rho GTPases in part by recruiting ARHGAP29 and suppressing RhoA signaling and dampening ROCK and MYH9 activities in endothelial cells.

Clinical significance 
A recent genome-wide association study (GWAS) has found that genetic variations in RASIP1 are associated with late-onset sporadic Alzheimer’s disease (LOAD). However, it's unknown how RASIP1 mutation contributes to disease.

References 

Genetics
Proteins
Genes